The Charitable Irish Society of Halifax is a historic society in Halifax, Nova Scotia which was established in 1786.  The Society assists those on low-income and holds other charitable events.  Many of the most prominent members of Nova Scotia have been members of the Society.

Notable members 
Robert Field (painter)
 John Albro
 Richard Bulkeley
 Joseph Howe
 Edward Kenny
 John George Pyke - childhood survivor of the Raid on Dartmouth (1751)
 John Sparrow David Thompson - Prime Minister of Canada
 Richard John Uniacke

See also 
Charitable Irish Society of Boston
 North British Society, Scots of Nova Scotia

References 

  Charitable Irish Society of Halifax - Official Website
Charitable Irish Society of Halifax - Nova Scotia Archives

External links 
 Gallery of Presidents
Constitution of the Charitable Irish Society of Halifax, Nova Scotia, as revised and amended in 1892 (1893)

Culture of Nova Scotia